Smiths Station is a city in Lee County, Alabama. It is part of the Columbus metropolitan area, Georgia. At the time of the 2000 census, it was still a census-designated place (CDP), and its population was 6,756. The area that incorporated as Smiths Station in 2001 was much smaller than the CDP, and contained a population of 4,926 by the 2010 census. Smiths Station, known to locals as "Smiths", is a bedroom community of Columbus, Georgia and Phenix City, Alabama. Smiths Station High School has an enrollment of over 1,800 students and is the 11th-largest high school in the state.

History
Smiths Station was first settled in 1738. The Central of Georgia Railway was extended through the community from Columbus, Georgia to Opelika, Alabama in 1845. The depot was named for Broadus Smith, a prominent early settler who lived near the city's current location.

Local legend contends that around 1960, local Jon Ergan grew tired of writing Smiths Station, so he took it upon himself to drop "Station" from the name of the community.

Smiths Station was officially incorporated on June 22, 2001, and is  Alabama's second newest city next to Center Point.

Geography

The city is located in the southeastern part of Lee County, adjacent to Phenix City, which it borders to the southeast. U.S. Routes 280 and 431 run through the eastern part of the city, leading northwest 19 mi (31 km) to Opelika and southeast 8 mi (13 km) to Phenix City. Numerous county and local roads also run through the city as well, leading to more rural areas in Lee County.

Climate
The climate in this area is characterized by relatively high temperatures and evenly distributed precipitation throughout the year. According to the Köppen Climate Classification system, Smiths Station has a humid subtropical climate, abbreviated "Cfa" on climate maps.

On March 3, 2019, an EF4 tornado ripped through Smiths Station at high-end EF2 strength. Major damage occurred to homes, businesses and trees in the area.

Demographics

From 1990–2001, the community was listed as Smiths CDP in the U.S. Census; the precipitous drop in population from 2000–2010 was due to just a segment of the CDP's incorporation as the city of Smiths Station. The remainder of the former CDP was disbanded as a separate entity for the 2010 census.

2000 census
At the 2000 census, there were 21,756 people, 7,806 households, and 6,252 families in the CDP. The racial makeup of the CDP was 84.79% White, 12.67% Black or African American, 0.38% Native American, 0.39% Asian, 0.01% Pacific Islander, 0.74% from other races, and 1.03% from two or more races. 2.08% of the population were Hispanic or Latino of any race.

Of the 7,806 households 44.6% had children under the age of 18 living with them, 64.4% were married couples living together, 11.4% had a female householder with no husband present, and 19.9% were non-families. 16.5% of households were one person and 4.8% were one person aged 65 or older. The average household size was 2.79 and the average family size was 3.12.

The age distribution was 30.4% under the age of 18, 7.9% from 18 to 24, 34.9% from 25 to 44, 19.6% from 45 to 64, and 7.2% 65 or older. The median age was 32 years. For every 100 females, there were 98.4 males. For every 100 females age 18 and over, there were 95.7 males.

The median household income was $43,977 and the median family income was $47,765. Males had a median income of $32,246 versus $23,707 for females. The per capita income for the CDP was $17,608. About 7.2% of families and 8.9% of the population were below the poverty line, including 11.6% of those under age 18 and 11.2% of those age 65 or over.

2010 census
At the 2010 census, there were 4,926 people in 1,913 households, including 1,407 families, in the city. There were 8,437 housing units. The racial makeup of the city was 80.3% White, 15.9% Black or African American, 0.7% Native American, 0.5% Asian, 0.0% Pacific Islander, 0.6% from other races, and 2.0% from two or more races. 2.8% of the population were Hispanic or Latino of any race.

Of the 1,913 households 31.1% had children under the age of 18 living with them, 53.9% were married couples living together, 15.1% had a female householder with no husband present, and 26.5% were non-families. 22.9% of households were one person and 7.5% were one person aged 65 or older. The average household size was 2.58 and the average family size was 2.99.

The age distribution was 24.1% under the age of 18, 9.0% from 18 to 24, 24.1% from 25 to 44, 29.7% from 45 to 64, and 13.1% 65 or older. The median age was 39.3 years. For every 100 females, there were 93.1 males. For every 100 females age 18 and over, there were 93.9 males.

The median household income was $47,969 and the median family income was $54,698. Males had a median income of $38,294 versus $25,394 for females. The per capita income for the city was $20,678. About 7.5% of families and 9.8% of the population were below the poverty line, including 13.7% of those under age 18 and 12.1% of those age 65 or over.

2020 census

As of the 2020 United States census, there were 5,384 people, 2,151 households, and 1,566 families residing in the city.

Education
Smiths Station forms a part of the Lee County School District.

Smiths Station High School is the city's only high school. Its school colors are black and white with a secondary use of silver; sports teams are called the Panthers. The school's "cheer squads" are award-winning and appear at all football and basketball games. In the past, the football team had more success, with the third-most Alabama state championship game appearances. The "Panther Spirit Marching Band"  has been invited to march for the Queen of the United Kingdom and has performed in the Dunkin' Donuts Thanksgiving Day Parade in Philadelphia, Pennsylvania. The band holds three Grand Championship awards and numerous best-in-class awards. The track-and-field team has been nationally ranked several times and have numerous alumni throughout the nation competing at the DI, DII, and professional levels.

Time zone
Although Alabama is legally in the Central Time Zone, Smiths Station's proximity to the larger cities of Phenix City and Columbus, Georgia causes areas within a 10-15 mile radius of Phenix City (including Smiths Station) to observe Eastern Time on a de facto basis.

Notable people
 Michael Kenneth Finney, a professional welterweight boxer, was born in Smiths Station in 1991.
 Conway Twitty, a country music singer born Harold Lloyd Jenkins in 1933, attended Smiths Station High School, where he played high school baseball.

Gallery

References

External links

Cities in Alabama
Cities in Lee County, Alabama
Populated places established in 2001
Former census-designated places in Alabama
Columbus metropolitan area, Georgia